Bernard Ross Lowther (born 1950) is a New Zealand former rugby league footballer who played in the 1970s. A New Zealand international three-quarter, he played club football for the Richmond Rovers in the Auckland Rugby League competition and in Sydney's NSWRFL Premiership for Canterbury-Bankstown and South Sydney

Bernie currently resides in south east Queensland & is a member of Carbrook Golf Club, he is a regular participant in Carbrook's Wednesday & Saturday competitions playing off a solid 16 handicap, which he will be looking to improve on after retiring earlier this year (2014).

References

Living people
New Zealand national rugby league team players
New Zealand rugby league players
Canterbury-Bankstown Bulldogs players
Auckland rugby league team players
South Sydney Rabbitohs players
1950 births
Rugby league centres
Rugby league wingers
Richmond Bulldogs players